Alireza Monadi Sefidan (born 1969) is an Iranian politician.

Monadi was born in Tabriz. He is a member of the 2008 and 9th Islamic Consultative Assembly from the electorate of Tabriz, Osku and Azarshahr with Hadi Gharaseyyed Romiani, Masoud Pezeshkian, Mohammad Hosein Farhanghi, Mohammad Esmaeil Saeidi and Reza Rahmani. Monadi won with 154,388 (26.24%) votes. Mondi Sefidan was a member the board of directors of the Parliament of Iran.

References

External links
 Mondi Sefidan Website

People from Tabriz
Deputies of Tabriz, Osku and Azarshahr
Living people
1969 births
Members of the 9th Islamic Consultative Assembly
Members of the 8th Islamic Consultative Assembly
Followers of Wilayat fraction members
Academic staff of Azarbaijan Shahid Madani University